FC Devon Oktyabrsky was a Russian football team from Oktyabrsky. It played professionally from 1967 to 1969 and from 1990 to 1995. Their best result was 1st place in Zone 6 of the Russian Second Division in 1993 (due to Russian league system reorganization in 1994 they did not advance to a higher level).

Team name history
 1967–1989: FC Neftyanik Oktyabrsky
 1990–1992: FC Avtopribor Oktyabrsky
 1993–1997: FC Devon Oktyabrsky
 1998–2000: FC Devon Serafimovsky (representing Serafimovsky, Bashkortostan)
 2001–2007: FC Devon Oktyabrsky

External links
   Official website
  Team history at KLISF

Association football clubs established in 1948
Association football clubs disestablished in 2008
Defunct football clubs in Russia
Sport in Bashkortostan
1948 establishments in Russia
2008 disestablishments in Russia